The 2016 AFF Championship, sponsored by Suzuki and officially known as the AFF Suzuki Cup 2016, was the 11th edition of the AFF Championship, the football championship of nations affiliated to the ASEAN Football Federation (AFF). The whole tournament ran from 19 November to 17 December 2016. After the recognition by FIFA as a "category A" tournament, the 2016 edition of the tournament would grant international ranking points for each match.

The group stages of the championships were held for the first time at Myanmar and the Philippines from 19–26 November 2016.

Thailand were the defending champions, but won the tournament by a 3–2 victory in the two-legged final against Indonesia to secure their fifth title.

Hosts
At the 11th ASEAN Football Federation Council meeting in Naypyidaw on 21 December 2013, Myanmar and the Philippines were named as co-hosts the group stage of the tournament. This will mark the first time that both countries will host the group stages of said competition.

The Philippine Football Federation (PFF) initially withdrew as co-host of the group stages in February 2016, citing issues with the Rizal Memorial Stadium as well as the availability of another venue. The replacing host were said to be announced on 12 March 2016, with Malaysia and 2014 co-hosts Singapore and Vietnam announcing they have or were to apply. The Philippines also later announced that they would appeal to keep their hosting rights.

On 7 March, the AFF accepted the appeal of the Philippines while Malaysia were named 'standby host', with Vietnam and Singapore withdrawing their bids. The Philippines were given until 11 March in order to secure a contract to use the Philippine Sports Stadium (PSS) as a venue. Rizal Memorial Stadium is to be used as a secondary venue during the final simultaneous group matches. On 12 March, it was confirmed that the Philippines retained hosting rights, following an AFF Council Meeting in Da Nang, Vietnam. The PFF was able to present a contract with the PSS to the AFF as well as a letter of guarantee from the Philippine Sports Commission.

Venues

Qualification

Also during the AFF Council Meeting in Naypyidaw (Myanmar), Cambodia were named as hosts for the qualification tournament.  Myanmar and the Philippines automatically qualify to the final round as hosts.

The Football Association of Indonesia was suspended by FIFA and they wouldn't have been able to participate in the tournament if suspension imposed on them won't be lifted by in time for the tournament. The AFF had given Indonesia a deadline of before 5 August 2016 to have the suspension lifted.  The suspension was lifted at the 66th FIFA Congress.

Qualified teams
The following eight teams qualified for the competition.

Draw
The draw for the 2016 AFF Championships was made on 2 August 2016, with Indonesia placed in the bottom pot after the FIFA's suspension. The identity of the eighth qualified team (Cambodia) was yet to be determined at the time of the draw.

Squads

Match officials
The following referees were chosen for the competition.

  Jarred Gillett
  Fu Ming
  Rowan Arumughan
  Hiroyuki Kimura
  Jumpei Iida
  Adham Makhadmeh
  Yaqoob Abdul Baki
  Kim Dong-jin
  Masoud Tufaylieh
  Çarymyrat Kurbanow
  Yu Ming-hsun
  Mohammed Abdulla Hassan Mohamed
  Valentin Kovalenko
  Ilgiz Tantashev

Group stage

Tiebreakers
Ranking in each group shall be determine as follows:
 Greater number of points obtained in all the group matches;
 Goal difference in all the group matches;
 Greater number of goals scored in all the group matches.
If two or more teams are equal on the basis on the above three criteria, the place shall be determined as follows:
 Result of the direct match between the teams concerned;
 Penalty shoot-out if only two teams were tied and they met in the last round of the group;
 Drawing lots by the Organising Committee.

Group A

 All matches played in the Philippines
 Times listed are local (UTC+8:00)

Group B

 All matches to be played in Myanmar.
 Times listed are local (UTC+6:30)

Knockout phase

Bracket

Scores after extra time are indicated by (a.e.t.), and penalty shoot-out are indicated by (pen.).

Semi-finals
First Leg

Second leg

Indonesia won 4–3 on aggregate.

Thailand won 6–0 on aggregate.

Finals

First Leg

Second Leg

Thailand won 3–2 on aggregate.

Best XI
The best XI was a squad consisting of the eleven most impressive players at the tournament.

Statistics

Winner

Awards

Goalscorers

Discipline
In the final tournament, a player is suspended for the subsequent match in the competition for either getting a red card, or accumulating two yellow cards in two different matches.

*Players who received a card during the final are not included here.

Tournament team rankings
This table will show the ranking of teams throughout the tournament.

Marketing

Match balls
The official ball for AFF Suzuki Cup 2016 used the Mitre Delta Fluo Hyperseam. Based on the Delta Hyperseam design, the ball will be the first fluo coloured official match ball in the AFF Suzuki Cup.

Sponsorship

Media coverage

Incidents and controversies

On 23 November, three days before the match between Malaysia and Myanmar, the Malaysian Minister of Youth and Sport Khairy Jamaluddin said that he had petitioned his country football association to boycott Myanmar as the group B host because of Myanmar government's alleged persecution to the Rohingya Muslims after repeated calls from West Malaysian Malay Muslim individuals and political groups of United Malays National Organisation (UMNO), Pan-Malaysian Islamic Party (PAS), People's Justice Party (PKR), National Trust Party (AMANAH) Penang branch as well from Malay extreme group of Pertubuhan Pribumi Perkasa to boycott the country. In response, the ASEAN Football Federation (AFF) warned Malaysia if they suddenly withdraw from the ongoing tournament without giving any valid reasons for the team problems just because of political concerns, the Football Association of Malaysia (FAM) will facing a long-term sanction from FIFA for letting political interference spread into the association. Two days latter on 25 November, FAM stated that they will not going to boycott the tournament and said that they would continue playing their last group match against Myanmar, with both of the team coaches playing down the issues before the match. However, in the last group B match, Myanmar shocked Malaysia with a 1–0 score and advance to the semi-finals for the first time since 2004, while Malaysia failed to advance for the first time since 2010.

During the second leg of the semi-final match in Hanoi between Indonesia and Vietnam, the decision by China referee Fu Ming was deemed as bias by most Vietnamese supporters as the referee did not give any action for any fouls committed by the Indonesian side, while heavily punishing the Vietnamese side when their goalkeeper Trần Nguyên Mạnh given a red card on the 76th minute in a sudden controversial decision. Following the heavy disappointment from Vietnamese supporters when their national team failed to qualify for the finals which mainly has been blamed due to the awful decision by the China referee, some Vietnamese supporters who lost their patience follow the Indonesian team bus after the end of the match while the team was on their way back to their hostel, throwing the bus with two large rocks resulting in a slight injury of an Indonesian goalkeeping coach and their team doctor. This was heavily criticised by Indonesian fans for the unsportsmanlike conduct shown by some of the Vietnamese supporters. One of the Indonesian players, Evan Dimas, describes the attacks as "what could end someone's career" as he witnessed "the two big rocks almost hit someone in the face while striking the bus window" which led their bus driver to make a U-turn back to Mỹ Đình National Stadium for protection from the Vietnamese authorities especially when the large angry crowd of motorcyclists began to number and try to surround their bus. A replacement bus was eventually dispatched with heavy security from the Vietnamese authorities following the attacks with the Vietnam Football Federation (VFF) and other Vietnamese fans issuing an apology over the incident.

At the first leg final in Bogor between Indonesia and Thailand, while Thai player Theerathon Bunmathan was taking up a free kick, his face was seen targeted with green laser light from Indonesian supporters. The laser lights continue to be pointed to other Thai players especially to Thai goalkeeper Kawin Thamsatchanan who later complained to Japanese referee Jumpei Iida for the lights that disrupted his concentration. Indonesia scored two goals shortly when Thai players began losing concentration. During the media session shortly after the end of the match, Thai coach Kiatisuk Senamuang openly stated about the laser light attacks affecting their team performances, in which it was also acknowledged by Indonesian coach Alfred Riedl who "criticised and felt shame on the behaviour of some of the Indonesian supporters although they won the first leg match in their home ground as their victory in the match could be perceived as unfair by their team opponent because of the incident". The Indonesian fans would later express their apology to all Thai fans over the incident. However, the Thai coach did not blame the laser incident to Indonesian side as it is "the duty of referee to make call on the incident" and adding that it is caused by "our own players mistake and Indonesian players have showed their great fighting spirit".

At the second leg final in Bangkok, one Indonesian player Abduh Lestaluhu was sent off in the 90th minute after he suddenly kicking the ball to Thai bench players as a sign of protest for their lack of sportsmanship. The incident start when the ball that was out from the touch of Thai defender and rolling towards the Thai bench was held by one of the Thai official sitting in the bench. When he want to take the ball to throw it back into the field, the Thai official refuse to give him in what he describe as "an act of delaying the time" when the Indonesian team are desperately in need to seek at least one quicker goal in the stoppage time to balance the aggregate. The ball was only given when he complained the issue to United Arab Emirates referee Abdulla Hassan, but in the way that he perceive as disrespectful and as a result he kicking the ball to them as a sign of protest where he was then approached by most of the players in the bench and given a red card by the referee. Shortly after he being sent off, he was seen showing his middle finger to Thai fans. His action were however not condemned by most Indonesian supporters and instead been back up by them, with the blame was put to the Thai side for their lacking of sportmanship in the event.

Following the flare throwing incident in the second leg final by Thai supporters comprising mostly from the members of Ultras Thailand shortly after their first leading goal scored by Siroch Chatthong for the Thai national team as well during the end of the match, the Royal Thai Police (RTP) launched an investigation following complains from Thai public that the group has caused damage to the image of Thai football. The Football Association of Thailand (FAT) also been fined with US$30,000 by the Asian Football Confederation (AFC) on 5 January 2017.

References

External links
 AFF Suzuki Cup 2016 - Official website

 
AFF Championship tournaments
1
2016
AFF Suzuki Cup
2016 in Burmese football
2016 in Philippine football
2016 in Asian football
AFF Championship
AFF Championship